Thomas William "Tommy" Mee (March 18, 1890 – May 16, 1981) nicknamed "Judge", was a Major League Baseball infielder who played in  with the St. Louis Browns.

External links

1890 births
1981 deaths
Major League Baseball shortstops
Baseball players from Chicago
St. Louis Browns players
Oshkosh Indians players
Madison Senators players
Wichita Witches players
Grand Rapids Bill-eds players
Grand Rapids Black Sox players